Loyola High School and Junior College is a private Catholic primary and secondary school located in Pashan, Pune, India. Founded by the Jesuits in 1961, the school provides a single-sex education for boys only from K to Grade X; and a co-educational environment in the pre-university college, for grades XI and XII.

Loyola is an English-medium school but requires Marathi and Hindi as compulsory languages up to the 8th standard. High school students have the option of taking German. There is a strong emphasis on science, mathematics, and the arts. History, civics, and geography are also offered. Loyola High School and Junior College are recognized by the Government of Maharashtra and prepare students for the Maharashtra State Secondary School Certificate (SSC, Std X) and the Higher Secondary Certificate (HSC, Std XII) examinations.  Loyola was voted one of the top 10 schools in Pune.

History

The school was founded in the early 1960s. Fr. Rudolph Schoch, S.J. had dreamt of the site where the school is now situated and requested the National Chemical Laboratory (who owned the land) to set up a school. Land was leased. The school takes its name from St. Ignatius of Loyola, a sixteenth-century saint who was recognised for his devotion to education and is best known for founding the Society of Jesus. Loyola High School is run by Jesuit priests and welcomes students from all ethnic, cultural, and economic backgrounds. Establishment of the school became necessary to take the load off the highly popular St. Vincent's High School, Pune Camp, and all students not living in Pune Camp and Pune City (up to Lakdipul, i.e., the bridge across the River Mutha connecting Pune City with Deccan Gymkhana) were asked to shift to Loyola's. The same logic was applied to the overcrowded St Mary's School opposite St. Vincent's and the affected girls were shifted to The Convent of Jesus And Mary at St. Joseph's High School, located directly between Loyola's and Pashan Road.

This entire school and staff was merged with Loyola and all children of residents in the NDA would come to Loyola's/St Joseph's, a 15-km trip by bus. This cost them 45 minutes each day, but was actually a 30-minute saving each way compared to schooling at St. Vincent's/St. Mary's. Rev. Rehm was the first Principal of Loyola, when the school became operational, from 1961–63, handing over to Rev. A.E.Oesch.

The girls' school building was not yet complete, so girls in Classes 10 and 11 were moved to Loyola's until 1963. Loyola's had an interesting faculty amongst the Jesuit Priests. Rev. Bernadetti, an Italian, taught German, followed by Rev. Toscano, another Italian, followed thereafter by Mrs Mani and Mrs Sahasrabudhe. Rev. D'Costa, a Portuguese priest taught English. In classes 10 and 11, Fr. Alphonse Oesch, SJ, an Austrian, took over German, English and Higher English. Rev. Gregory taught up to nine subjects-Algebra, Geometry, Arithmetic, Higher Arithmetic, Physics, Chemistry, Biology, Botany and Zoology - assisted by Mr. Contractor. Mr. Mahamuni, spent half his time as a Hindi teacher teaching Drawing; the Drawing teacher, Mr. Khatavkar, taught Maharashtrian History. The tradition continued through the 1980s and 1990s when Mr. Sylvester Swamy, the sports teacher, taught geography and mathematics. Mr. Xavier, who was a graduate in English, taught Maths and Physics.

In 1965-66, 29 boys appeared for their Matriculate (Class XI) and all 29 got a First Division, with seven Distinctions. One lad came first in the state, but was relegated to 2nd for an unknown reason. The prominent industrialist, Racehorse owner and ex- Member of the Committee at Royal Western India Turf Club Ltd., Mr. Vijay Shirke was among the seven distinctions.
Fr. Oesch, who served as Principal from 1963 to 1966, had represented Austria in the 1936 Olympics in both soccer and javelin throw. Thanks to his efforts in one year thereafter, Loyola won every possible inter-school athletics or sports meet. To cite an example, in 1966 Loyola was 0-5 down in goals vs Modern School at the halfway stage in an inter-school match, when Rev. Oesch arrived and spoke to his boys at the interval. They equalised in the next 45 minutes, reaching 5-5, winning the replay next day 6-5.

The school had 474 boys and 27 girls registered in 1961. The Ground floor had class rooms, the Principal's office, the admin section, the bookshop, the watering hole and Physics laboratories. The first floor had classrooms and Chemistry laboratories. There were no Biology or Zoology labs. The 2nd/top floor was only partly constructed and housed the Jesuit priests. It took two years for completion of Phase 1 of the school and the girls returned to their school as that edifice had also been completed.

With all rooms available, it was time to move the Jesuits into a community house of their own, and use all rooms on the three floors, numbering 30, as classrooms. In the mid-eighties, the local rule on pupil strength per class was amended to increase boys per class to thirty five. The school could now accommodate over 1000 students. A small temporary seminary for eight was built behind the school, extending westwards, which was adequate, but there was no assembly hall or space for comprehensive laboratories. It was decided to integrate the extant seminary with a much larger and fully equipped Laboratory Section being erected directly behind the School and build a separate walled-in seminary just off the approach road to the School, to the East. The Principal and other Jesuits moved into this building.

As part of the school's Golden Jubilee celebrations, the biology, physics, chemistry labs were renovated; the E-Learning program was introduced; the assembly stage was re-built; and Loyola hosted IDEA, a science exhibition in which ten schools participated.

Overview

Location 

The school is located in the Pashan area, near Shivaji Nagar,  from Pune railway station. Close by is the Indian Institute of Science Education and Research. On the other side of the hill flanking the school lies the Chaturshringi temple.

Facilities

There is a two-floored library, and science and computer labs. The auditorium has a stage with lighting and balcony seating. In 2011 Esense Learning program was introduced in the school. Projectors were installed in every classroom.

Sports facilities include a 25-meter swimming pool, diving boards, children's pool, basketball courts, and football and hockey fields. The swimming pool complex was completed in 1971. Loyola remains one of the few schools in Pune with a 400m Olympic-size track for athletics.

A FIFA-standard natural grass football pitch was recently inaugurated. The four-inch sand-based pitch, backed with an auto popup irrigation system and a slit-drain drainage system, is a first-of-its-kind at any school in the city. The idea of having a sand-based pitch below a grass pitch was primarily to be in sync with world practices that include having a good drainage system and importantly softness to the ground. As a school it remained pertinent to give the children a surface that is playable all year round and reduce injury risk in their formative years. At the inauguration, members of the Bengaluru FC team attended including Arjuna and Padma Shri awardee) Sunil Chhetri, goalkeeper Gurpreet Singh Sandhu and Udanta Singh.

Houses
The house system fosters a sense of collective responsibility and solidarity amongst students. It serves as the centre of school life, with students from houses competing at sports and other co-curricular activities.  The four houses are Blue, Green, Red, and Gold. Every house has a Commander and Flag Bearer.

School uniform
Boys from class 1 to class 8 wear half-sleeved beige shirts and dark beige shorts. Class 9 and 10 boys wear dark beige trousers and the same shirt. Junior college boys wear full-sleeved beige shirts and dark beige trousers. The rest of the uniform consists of brown shoes and a brown belt. The PT uniform consists of the house-coloured, sleeveless T-shirt and shorts.

Co-curricula activities 
Loyola is one of the few schools which has cross-country running as part of physical training for its students. Loyola High School and St. Vincent's High School are sister/brother schools and share a rivalry in sports. Loyola won the PSAA (Pune Schools Athletic Association)  Under-12 Championship, Under-14 Football Championship, and Chess Championship.

Principals 
The following individuals have served as principal of the school:

Alumni associations
The Ex-Loyola Students' Association (ELSA) arranged career seminars, inter-school quiz competitions, sponsored the school magazine, and arranged the school's 25th year celebrations. Today ELSA stands inactive but the Ex-Loyola Alumni Network (ELAN) was formed by another generation of alumni. ELAN has been active since 1997. It organises annual get-togethers for ex-students. It is now the official alumni body of the school and ELSA is merged to ELAN. ELAN supports school activities and assists former teachers. ELAN planned the Golden Jubilee celebrations of the school in 2010-2011.

See also

 List of Jesuit schools
 List of schools in Pune
 Violence against Christians in India

References

External links
 Loyola High School website

Jesuit secondary schools in India
Jesuit primary schools in India
Primary schools in India
High schools and secondary schools in Maharashtra
Christian schools in Maharashtra
Private schools in Maharashtra
Schools in Pune
Educational institutions established in 1961
1961 establishments in Maharashtra